Badham is a surname shared by several notable people, among them being:

People born in Australia
 Van Badham (b. 1974), Australian-British playwright

People born in Canada
 John Badham (sportscaster) (1937–2016), Canadian sportscaster and radio announcer

People born in the United Kingdom
 Charles Badham (1780–1845), British physician and classical scholar
 Charles Badham (1813–1884), British-Australian academic and classical scholar
 Charles David Badham (1805–1857), British physician, mycologist, and writer
 Edward Badham (b. 1860), English police sergeant involved in the investigation of the Jack the Ripper murders
 John Badham (b. 1939), English-American film director
 Jack Badham (1919–1992), English footballer
 Molly Badham (1914–2007), English zoologist
 Paul Badham (b. 1942), British academic

People born in the United States
 Mary Badham (b. 1952), American actress
 Robert Badham (1929–2005), American national politician

Other
Badhan, Persian governor of pre-Islamic Yemen

Notes